Joseph Helszajn , (died 11 October 2019)  was Professor of Microwave Engineering at Heriot-Watt University.

He was awarded the J.J. Thomson Medal by the Institution of Electrical Engineers in 1995, and elected a Fellow of the Royal Academy of Engineering in 1996. He was made an Officer of the Order of the British Empire in the 1997 Queen's Birthday Honours for services to engineering.

He died on 11 October 2019.

References

Officers of the Order of the British Empire
Fellows of the Royal Academy of Engineering
Fellows of the Royal Society of Edinburgh
Fellow Members of the IEEE
Academics of Heriot-Watt University
British electrical engineers
2019 deaths